Power Music is an American record label based in Salt Lake City, UT.  Their catalog is composed entirely of rerecorded popular songs to specific Beats Per Minute as part of a non-stop workout mix.

Power Music, Inc. developed a series of albums for the NBC show The Biggest Loser, Shape magazine, and Carmen Electra.

Power Music's catalog is distributed digitally on their websites, including one such site, ClickMix.com, that uses proprietary technology to allow users to create their own compilation of workout music by choosing the tracks and the tempo.

Power Music used to be known as Power Productions and were originally based out of Gaithersburg, MD.

Selected discography

Notes

References

See also
Power Music http://www.powermusic.com
Workout Music http://www.workoutmusic.com
ClickMix http://www.clickmix.com

American record labels